Elijah Hall-Thompson (born August 22, 1994) is an American track and field sprinter and American record holder in the indoor 200 meters. At the NCAA Division I Championships he helped the Houston Cougars win and set the collegiate record in the  meters relay in 2018, and won both the 60 meters and the 200 meters at the NCAA Division I Indoor Championships in 2018. His winning time of 20.02 seconds in the 200 meters is the second fastest time ever achieved over the distance indoors.

Hall qualified to represent the United States for the 2017 World Championships in the 200 m, but withdrew due to an injury.

Early life
Elijah Hall grew up in Texas and attended Morton Ranch High School, where he played American football. Due to his football speed, he would run track after the football season ended. After his junior season, Hall tore his ACL; after recovering, he broke his arm during football the following year. However, he clocked an impressive 20.60 seconds over the 200m at the Texas UIL 6A State Championships. He began to take more interest in track, and joined a club during the summer where he trained with his track rival from Ridge Point High School, Cameron Burrell, son of former world record holder Leroy Burrell. Hall decided to leave football behind in order to be a healthier athlete, and focus on track.

Collegiate career

2015-2016: Community College
Hall attended Garden City Community College for a semester, then transferred to Butler County Community College. He won the NJCAA indoor title in the 200m, and finished 8th in the 60m. Injuries continued to plague him from time-to-time, and he was just able to help his team finish 2nd in the 4x100m. In 2016, he defended his indoor 200m title and finished 7th in the 60m. Outdoors, he won the 100m in 10.16 and finished 2nd in the 200m. He then competed at the Olympic Trials in Eugene, Oregon, finishing 6th in his 100m heat;  and he was disqualified in his 200m heat.

2017: Joining the Houston Cougars
Hall returned to Texas and transferred to the University of Houston, to join Burrell and to be coached by his father Leroy and track & field legend Carl Lewis. His injury returned as he pulled up in the 200m at the Fayetteville Tyson Invitational. Two months later, he appeared to be doing well outdoors, winning both the 100m and the 200m at the American Athletic Conference Championships, the latter in a wind-aided 19.96. His injury returned at the NCAA West Preliminary round, and he was forced to miss the NCAA Championships. Hall finally got his measure at the US Championships, where he finished 3rd in the 200m with 20.21 seconds and qualified for the World Championships in London, England. However, his injury returned yet again and he was forced to miss out.

2018: National Record Holder

Finally feeling healthy, Hall began to break through in the 2018 season. Leading up to the championships, he had only been defeated once between the 60m and the 200m. At the NCAA Indoor Championships, Hall stumbled in the 60m but was able to make an unbelievable late charge and win the title in a personal best of 6.52 seconds. Then, in the 200m, he set a collegiate, American and NACAC record of 20.02 seconds, the second-fastest time in history over the indoor 200m. He then helped Houston's 4x400m team to 4th place.

Despite his incredible 200m performance, Leroy Burrell and Carl Lewis decided for Hall to focus on the 100m for the outdoor season. Though his first few races were rough, he made it through to the final at the NCAA Championships with 2 other Cougars: Cameron and junior Mario Burke. Having put 3 athletes in the 100m final, Houston won the 4x100m with ease, defending their title and setting a collegiate record of 38.17 seconds in the rain. Then, in a surprise finish, Hall finished 2nd in the 100m behind Cameron, both defeating the favorite from Florida State Andre Ewers. Burke finished in 8th, meaning Houston scored 19 points in the final, contributing to their 2nd place team finish.

In October, Hall and Cameron turned professional and signed with Nike and Red Bull.

Statistics
All information from World Athletics profile unless otherwise noted.

Personal Bests

National championship results
 = did not finish
 = disqualified
 = personal best
 = national (American) record
 = collegiate record

NJCAA and NCAA results from Track & Field Results Reporting System.

Seasonal bests

Notes

References

External links

 (Track & Field Results Reporting System)
 (Track & Field Results Reporting System)
Video of Elijah Hall's indoor 200 m American and collegiate record at the NCAA via YouTube

1994 births
Living people
African-American male track and field athletes
American male sprinters
Track and field athletes from Houston
Houston Cougars men's track and field athletes
Butler Community College alumni
United States collegiate record holders in athletics (track and field)
21st-century African-American sportspeople